The 1996–97 New Mexico Lobos men's basketball team represented the University of New Mexico as a member of the Western Athletic Conference. The Lobos were coached by head coach Dave Bliss and played their home games at the University Arena, also known as "The Pit", in Albuquerque, New Mexico. New Mexico finished 3rd in the WAC Mountain division regular season standings and lost to Utah in the semifinals of the WAC Tournament. The Lobos received an at-large bid to the NCAA tournament as No. 3 seed in the East region. After defeating Old Dominion in the opening round, New Mexico was bounced in the round of 32 by Louisville, 64–63, to finish with a 25–8 record (11–5 WAC).

The top four scorers (career) in school history played on this team – Charles Smith, Kenny Thomas, Lamont Long, and Clayton Shields.

Roster

Schedule and results

|-
!colspan=9 style=| Regular season

|-
!colspan=9 style=| WAC tournament

|-
!colspan=9 style=| NCAA tournament

Rankings

References

New Mexico Lobos men's basketball seasons
New Mexico
New Mexico
Lobos
Lobos